Ceremony – A New Order Tribute is a collection of New Order covers by independent acts from the United States and Europe, compiled into a double CD Digi-pack and two additional digital albums. Produced by Sonshine Ward and Marshall Dickson, it was released in February 2010 by 24 Hour Service Station, with contributions from artists such as Peter Hook (one of the original members of both New Order and its original incarnation, Joy Division), Kites With Lights, and Rabbit in the Moon. The album is dedicated to the founder of Factory Records, Tony Wilson, and it benefits the Salford Foundation Trust's Tony Wilson Award.

Background
The album consists of cover songs of the band New Order, an English musical group formed in 1980 by Bernard Sumner (vocals, guitars, synthesizers), Peter Hook (bass, backing vocals, electronic drums) and Stephen Morris (drums, synthesizers). New Order were formed in the wake of the demise of their previous group Joy Division, following the suicide of vocalist Ian Curtis. They were soon joined by additional keyboardist Gillian Gilbert. New Order combined post-punk and electronic dance, and became one of the most critically acclaimed bands of the 1980s. They were first recorded by Tony Wilson, founder of Factory Records.

Production
Ceremony – A New Order Tribute is a tribute album released by 24 Hour Service Station in Tampa, Florida. It features covers by various independent acts from the United States and Europe, compiled into a Double CD Digi-pack and two additional digital albums. Produced by Sonshine Ward, it was released in February 2010 by 24 Hour Service Station.

The album is dedicated to the founder of Factory Records, Tony Wilson, who died in 2007 from cancer. Marshall Dickson was originally inspired by Wilson to start 24 Hour Service Station.

The album benefits the Salford Foundation Trust's Tony Wilson Award. Artists donated time and recordings to support the charity, which "assists young people who demonstrate a special talent or ambition in the arts or creative skills."

Reception

AllMusic reviewer William Ruhlmann gave the album 3.5/5 stars, and praised in particular the tracks that strayed from the original New Order compositions. He wrote, "Ceremony: A New Order Tribute is not the first album to pay tribute to the British techno-dance band New Order. But this one is more ambitious, spreading across two CDs, and it can claim at least partial authorization from the group."

Track listing

Double CD (Physical)

The Digital Album

Twelve Versions of Ceremony

Personnel
Producer – Marshall Dickson, Sonshine Ward
Art Direction, Design – Marshall Dickson, Sonshine Ward
Liner Notes – Peter Hook
Photography of New Order – Kevin Cummins
Photography of Tony Wilson – Katja Ruge

References

Further reading
3hive – Top 9's of 2009

External links
Official Album Website
Ceremony – A New Order Tribute @ Discogs

New Order (band) tribute albums
2010 albums
24 Hour Service Station albums
24 Hour Distribution albums